The Tyrrell 009 was a Formula One racing car that was designed by Maurice Philippe for Tyrrell Racing for the  season.

The 009, was powered by the Ford-Cosworth DFV V8 engine and made its competition debut in the first race of the season in Argentina. The 009s were driven by Frenchmen Didier Pironi and Jean-Pierre Jarier, Englishman Geoff Lees replaced Jarier for German GP and Irishman Derek Daly at Austrian GP. Daly later drove a third car at two final races of the season. For the 1980 season 009 raced in first two races and then was replaced by 010.

Complete Formula One World Championship results
(key) (results in italics indicate fastest lap, results in bold indicate pole position)

* 9 points scored in  using the Tyrrell 010

Tyrrell Formula One cars
1979 Formula One season cars